Photographic Horizons was a United States television series where panelists discussed the art and science of photography. The show aired on Wednesdays at 8:30pm on the now-defunct DuMont Television Network.

Episode status
A single kinescope recording of this series survives at the Paley Center for Media, dating from August 25, 1948, when the show was still on a local DuMont station. This in fact is one of the oldest surviving records of a live television program and runs a total of 55 minutes, and may represent two episodes.

See also
List of programs broadcast by the DuMont Television Network
List of surviving DuMont Television Network broadcasts
1948-49 United States network television schedule

References

Bibliography
David Weinstein, The Forgotten Network: DuMont and the Birth of American Television (Philadelphia: Temple University Press, 2004) 
Alex McNeil, Total Television, Fourth edition (New York: Penguin Books, 1980) 
Tim Brooks and Earle Marsh, The Complete Directory to Prime Time Network TV Shows, Third edition (New York: Ballantine Books, 1964)

External links
Photographic Horizons at IMDb
DuMont historical website

Black-and-white American television shows
1940s American television series
DuMont Television Network original programming